Marco Schmidt (born 5 September 1983) is a German shot putter.

Competition record

References

1983 births
Living people
German male shot putters
World Athletics Championships athletes for Germany